Jordan Folklore Museum is a museum in Amman, Jordan. It is located next to the Roman amphitheater, it was established in 1971. The museum showcases a collection of Jordanian cultural heritage items from the desert (Bedu), villages (Reef), and towns (Madineh) including; costumes, musical instrument and handicrafts. Along with mosaics.

References

Museums established in 1971
Museums in Amman
1971 establishments in Jordan